James Cousins (born 19 March 1998) is a professional Australian rules footballer who most recently played for the Hawthorn Football Club in the Australian Football League. James was born in small country town of Mansfield, Victoria.

Cousins won the Murray Bushrangers best and fairest award in 2016. He also played one match for 's VFL side.

AFL career

After being overlooked in the National draft, Cousins was picked by Hawthorn with their third selection and forty-sixth overall in the 2017 national rookie draft

A sequence of high possessions games playing for Box Hill gave the selectors notice that he was ready for the big league.  Cousins was elevated off the rookie list when Cyril Rioli was put on the long-term injury list. He made his debut against Sydney on the SCG, he also kicked a goal .

On 9 July 2017, Cousins injured his shoulder whilst playing for Box Hill. Five days later it was announced that Cousins required surgery and would miss the remainder of the 2017 season.

On 2 August 2017, Cousins signed a two-year rookie contract extension to stay at Hawthorn until the end of 2019.

Cousins was delisted by Hawthorn at the end of the 2021 season and was wished all the best for his future endeavours.

He started playing for Williamstown in the VFL after being delisted and made 8 appearances, kicking 2 goals, in an injury-interrupted 2022 season.

Personal life
Cousins is currently studying a Bachelor of Commerce at Deakin University.

Statistics
 Statistics are correct to the end of 2021.

|- style=background:#EAEAEA
| 2017 ||  || 46
| 3 || 1 || 0 || 22 || 17 || 39 || 5 || 13 || 0.3 || 0.0 || 7.3 || 5.7 || 13.0 || 1.7 || 4.3 || 0
|-
| 2018 ||  || 46
| 4 || 0 || 0 || 24 || 27 || 51 || 13 || 11 || 0.0 || 0.0 || 6.0 || 6.8 || 12.8 || 3.3 || 2.8 || 0
|- style=background:#EAEAEA
| 2019 ||  || 46
| 12 || 8 || 4 || 129 || 90 || 219 || 51 || 33 || 0.7 || 0.3 || 10.8 || 7.5 || 18.3 || 4.3 || 2.8 || 0
|-
| 2020 ||  || 46
| 6 || 1 || 3 || 60 || 57 || 117 || 20 || 16 || 0.2 || 0.5 || 10.0 || 9.5 || 19.5 || 3.3 || 2.7 || 0
|- style=background:#EAEAEA
| 2021 ||  || 24
| 10 || 2 || 5 || 101 || 86 || 187 || 27 || 37 || 0.2 || 0.5 || 10.1 || 8.6 || 18.7 || 2.7 || 3.7 || 0
|- class="sortbottom"
! colspan=3| Career
! 35 !! 12 !! 12 !! 336 !! 277 !! 613 !! 116 !! 110 !! 0.3 !! 0.3 !! 9.6 !! 7.9 !! 17.5 !! 3.3 !! 3.1 !! 0
|}

Notes

Honours and achievements
Team
 VFL premiership player: 2018

References

External links

Living people
1998 births
Australian rules footballers from Victoria (Australia)
Murray Bushrangers players
Box Hill Football Club players
Hawthorn Football Club players
Williamstown Football Club players